The Dallas Downtown Historic District is a  area in downtown Dallas, Texas, United States that was designated a historic district in 2006 to preserve the diverse architectural history of the area.

See also

National Register of Historic Places listings in Dallas County, Texas
Recorded Texas Historic Landmarks in Dallas County
List of Dallas Landmarks

References

External links

History of Dallas
Historic districts on the National Register of Historic Places in Texas
National Register of Historic Places in Dallas